Volodymyr Vasilyevich Fomin (1902–1942) was a Ukrainian footballer and coach. He was the oldest brother of Kostiantyn Fomin and Mykola Fomin.

Volodymyr played for FC Dynamo Kharkiv between 1928 and 1936 during which he was Bronze medalist at the USSR Championships in 1935. He coached the club in 1937 and 1938 - 1941 and a brief spell in 1938 managing Dynamo Kiev. He played for the Soviet Union several times in unofficial matches in the mid-1920s.  In 1942 he was executed by the German occupiers (or "fascists") for hiding a Jew.

References

External links
 
 Profile on UkrSoccerHistory 
 Profile on junik.lv 
 

1902 births
1942 deaths
Footballers from Kharkiv
People from Kharkov Governorate
Ukrainian footballers
Soviet footballers
FC Dynamo Kharkiv players
Ukrainian football managers
Soviet football managers
FC Dynamo Kyiv managers
FC Dynamo Kharkiv managers
Ukrainian people executed by Nazi Germany
Association football midfielders
Soviet civilians killed in World War II